A Twenty20 International (T20I) is an international cricket match between two teams, each having T20I status, as determined by the International Cricket Council, the sport's world governing body. In a T20I, the two teams play a single innings each, which is restricted to a maximum of 20 overs. The format was originally introduced by the England and Wales Cricket Board for the county cricket competition with the first matches contested on 13 June 2003 between the English counties in the Twenty20 Cup. The first T20I took place on 17 February 2005 when Australia defeated New Zealand by 44 runs at Eden Park in Auckland, with Australian captain Ricky Ponting finishing not out on 98.

A century is a score of one hundred or more runs by a batsman in a single innings. This is regarded as a notable achievement. The first century in a T20I match was scored by Chris Gayle of the West Indies who made 117 against South Africa at the inaugural ICC World Twenty20 in 2007. South Africa won the match, one of only 18 occurrences which did not result in a victory to the team with the player scoring the century. One further T20I century has been scored in a match that ended in a no result.

India's Rohit Sharma leads the list with four T20I centuries, followed by Czech Republic's Sabawoon Davizi, India's Suryakumar Yadav, Australia's Glenn Maxwell and New Zealand's Colin Munro with three each. A further 14 players have scored two T20I centuries including Evin Lewis of the West Indies. Lewis' first century came during the 2016 series against India at the Central Broward Regional Park in Lauderhill, Florida. In reply, India's KL Rahul finished on 110 not out, the first occasion where two T20I centuries were scored in the same match. Rahul's innings was one of the 23 instances where a batsman scored a century in the second innings of a T20I match. 

In July 2018, Finch posted 172 from 76 balls against Zimbabwe during the 2018 Zimbabwe Tri-Nation Series to break his own record for the highest score in a T20I match, eclipsing the 156 he set in August 2013. Rohit Sharma, David Miller of South Africa and the Czech Republic's Sudesh Wickramasekara all share the record for the fastest T20I century, reaching the milestone from 35 deliveries.

Only Lesile Dunbar of Serbia, Ravinderpal Singh of Canada, Namibia's Jean-Pierre Kotze and Matthew Spoors of Canada have scored century on their T20I debuts.

The oldest player to score a T20I century is Gibraltar's Balaji Pai who was aged 39 years and 272 days when he reached 107 not out runs against Bulgaria in October 2021. At the age of 18 years and 280 days, Gustav Mckeon of France became the youngest, scoring 109 runs in July 2022 against Switzerland.

, 113 centuries have been scored by 88 different players.

Key

Centuries

Notes

References

Twenty20 International
Centuries